The Malta Baseball and Softball Association (MABS) is the national governing body of baseball and softball in Malta.

History

Baseball and softball are minor but growing sports in Malta and first started in 1980, led by an ex-pat American doctor, Dr Fredericks, who gave lessons in softball to students at Stella Maris College, in Gzira. As softball grew in popularity Dr Fredericks moved to the Marsa Sports Complex, and using borrowed equipment from the Verdala International School he started to teach baseball. The early players of the sport on the island, under the tutelage of Dr Fredericks, were mainly Canadian and US citizens living in Malta. Maltese children soon began to take up the sports, the legacy of which can be seen today in that Patrick Pace, the founder of the Mustangs Baseball Club was one of those children.

The Malta Baseball and Softball Association was formed in 1983, with the support of representatives from the Federazione Italiana Baseball Softball. MABS joined the Confederation of European Baseball in 1983  and in 2010, it joined the European Softball Federation (ESF).

MABS Board
The current MABS board is comprised as follows:
President: Andrew Bajo
Vice President: Charles Micallef
Treasurer: Oliver Frendo
Secretary General: Kevin Spiteri
Director of Baseball: Michael Bartolo
Director of Softball: Joseph Scicluna
Public Relations and Events Manager: Christine Bezzina

Previous Presidents

Jeff Tabone

References

External links 
Malta Baseball and Softball Association official website
MABS profile on the Maltese Olympic Committee website
World Baseball Softball Confederation official website

Baseball governing bodies in Europe
Baseball
Softball governing bodies
Softball in Europe
Softball